Young Farm is a historic farm complex and national historic district located near Florence, Florence County, South Carolina.  The district encompasses 5 contributing buildings and 1 contributing structure associated with the dairy farm of Fred H. Young. The complex consists of a two-story frame main residence and a collection of outbuildings including a dairy barn, truck shed, cow shed, and silos. Fred H. Young, a farmer and partner in Young's Pedigreed Seed Farms, won regard throughout the South for his high-grade cottonseed and cattle.

It was listed on the National Register of Historic Places in 1983.

References

Farms on the National Register of Historic Places in South Carolina
Historic districts on the National Register of Historic Places in South Carolina
Buildings and structures in Florence County, South Carolina
National Register of Historic Places in Florence County, South Carolina